Ban Sang is the westernmost district (amphoe) of Prachinburi province, central Thailand.

History 
In the past, the area of the district was dense forest with many wild elephants. Laotians from Vientiane moved to settle their village in the area, which they named Ban Chang (lit., 'elephant village'). Later the name changed to Ban Sang. Ban Sang district was established in 1905.

Geography 
Neighboring districts are (from the northwest clockwise): Ongkharak, Mueang Nakhon Nayok, and Pak Phli of Nakhon Nayok province; Mueang Prachinburi and Si Mahosot of Prachinburi Province; Ratchasan, Bang Khla, Khlong Khuean and Bang Nam Priao of Chachoengsao province.

The important water resource is the Prachinburi River.

Administration 
The district is divided into nine sub-districts (tambons), which are further subdivided into 93 villages (mubans). Ban Sang itself is a township (thesaban tambon) which covers parts of tambons Ban Sang and Bang Krabao. There are a further seven tambon administrative organizations (TAO).

References 

Ban Sang